The term seeding and related terms such as seeded are used in several different contexts:
Sowing, planting seeds in a place or on an object
Cloud seeding, manipulating cloud formations
Seeding (computing), a concept in computing and peer-to-peer file sharing
Seeding (fluid dynamics), a process done while attempting to evaluate the flow of a fluid
Seeding (sex act), a reference to internal ejaculation inside of a sexual partner
Seeding (sports), setting up and/or adjusting a tournament bracket
 Planet seeding, or Panspermia, a theory dealing with propagation of simple lifeforms to inhabit planets
A seeding machine, a mechanical device often used in agricultural work
A seeding trial, an event done during a business' marketing research 
Database seeding, populating a database with an initial set of data

See also
 Seed (disambiguation)
 Seedling (disambiguation)
 Super-seeding algorithm